Sir Thomas Wharton (c 1588 – 17 April 1622) was an English landowner and politician who sat in the House of Commons between 1614 and 1622.

Wharton was the second son of Philip Wharton, 3rd Baron Wharton  and his wife Frances Clifford, second daughter of Henry Clifford, 2nd Earl of Cumberland.  He purchased the estate of Aske Hall at Easby, Yorkshire from Lady Eleanor Bowes, a distant relative early in 1611 and was knighted at Whitehall on 25 April 1611. In 1614, he was elected Member of Parliament for Westmorland and re-elected in 1621.

King James came to Aske on 16 April 1617.

Wharton died at the age of about 34. He had married Lady Philadelphia Carey, daughter of Robert Carey, 1st Earl of Monmouth on 11 April 1611.  His elder brother George had been killed in a duel in 1609, and thus his eldest son young Philip inherited the barony when the 3rd Baron died in 1625. Wharton's second son Thomas was also MP for Westmorland.

References

1580s births
1622 deaths
17th-century English landowners
English MPs 1614
English MPs 1621–1622
Knights Bachelor
Younger sons of barons